Mission Valley USD 330 is a public unified school district headquartered in Eskridge, Kansas, United States.  The district includes the communities of Eskridge, Harveyville, Dover, Keene, Wilmington, and nearby rural areas.

Schools
The school district operates the following schools located 6 miles northeast of Eskridge:
 Mission Valley High School
 Mission Valley Elementary

History
In 2004, "Wabaunsee East USD 330" changed its name to "Mission Valley USD 330".

See also
 Kansas State Department of Education
 Kansas State High School Activities Association
 List of high schools in Kansas
 List of unified school districts in Kansas

References

External links
 

School districts in Kansas